What's Going On is the eleventh studio album by American soul singer Marvin Gaye. It was released on May 21, 1971, by the Motown Records subsidiary label Tamla. Recorded between 1970 and 1971 in sessions at Hitsville U.S.A., Golden World, and United Sound Studios in Detroit, and at The Sound Factory in West Hollywood, California, it was Gaye's first album to credit him as a producer and to credit Motown's in-house studio band, the session musicians known as the Funk Brothers.

What's Going On is a concept album with most of its songs segueing into the next and has been categorized as a song cycle. The narrative established by the songs is told from the point of view of a Vietnam veteran returning to his home country to witness hatred, suffering, and injustice. Gaye's introspective lyrics explore themes of drug abuse, poverty, and the Vietnam War. He has also been credited with promoting awareness of ecological issues before the public outcry over them had become prominent ("Mercy Mercy Me").

What's Going On stayed on the Billboard Top LPs for over a year and became Gaye's second number-one album on Billboards Soul LPs chart, where it stayed for nine weeks. The title track, which had been released in January 1971 as the album's lead single, hit number two on the Billboard Hot 100 and held the top position on Billboards Soul Singles chart five weeks running. The follow-up singles "Mercy Mercy Me (The Ecology)" and "Inner City Blues (Make Me Wanna Holler)" also reached the top 10 of the Hot 100, making Gaye the first male solo artist to place three top ten singles on the Hot 100 from one album.

The album was an immediate commercial and critical success, and came to be viewed by music historians as a classic of 1970s soul.  Broad-ranging surveys of critics, musicians, and the general public have shown that What's Going On is regarded as one of the greatest albums of all time and a landmark recording in popular music. In 1985, writers on British music weekly the NME voted it the best album of all time. In 2020, it was ranked number one on Rolling Stones list of the 500 Greatest Albums of All Time.

Background

By the end of the 1960s, Marvin Gaye had fallen into a deep depression following the brain tumor diagnosis of his Motown singing partner Tammi Terrell, the failure of his marriage to Anna Gordy, a growing dependency on cocaine, troubles with the IRS, and struggles with Motown Records, the label he had signed with in 1961. One night, while holed up at a Detroit apartment, Gaye attempted suicide with a handgun,  only to be saved from committing the act by Berry Gordy's father.

Gaye started to experience more international success around this time as both a solo artist with hits such as "I Heard It Through the Grapevine" and "Too Busy Thinking About My Baby" and as a dual artist with Tammi Terrell, but Gaye said during this time that he felt he "didn't deserve" his success and he felt like "a puppet - Berry's puppet, Anna's puppet. I had a mind of my own and I wasn't using it." In March 1970, Gaye's singing partner Terrell died of a brain tumor. The singer responded to Terrell's death by refusing to perform onstage for several years. In January 1970, Motown released Gaye's next studio album, That's the Way Love Is, but Gaye refused to promote the recording, choosing to stay at home. During this secluded period, Gaye ditched his previous clean-cut image to grow a beard, and preferred to wear sweatsuits instead of dress suits and sweaters.

The singer also got back in touch with his spirituality and also attended several concerts held by the Detroit Symphony Orchestra, which had been used for several Motown recordings in the 1960s. Around the spring of 1970, Gaye also began seriously pursuing a career in football with the professional football team the Detroit Lions of the NFL, even working out with the Eastern Michigan Eagles football team. However, his pursuit of a tryout was stopped after the owner of the team advised him that any future injury would derail his career. Gaye befriended three of the Lions teammates, Mel Farr, Charlie Sanders and Lem Barney, as well as then-Detroit Pistons star Dave Bing.

Conception

While traveling on his tour bus with the Four Tops on May 15, 1969, Four Tops member Renaldo "Obie" Benson witnessed an act of police brutality and violence committed on anti-war protesters who had been protesting at Berkeley's People's Park in what was later termed as "Bloody Thursday". Benson later told author Ben Edmonds, "I saw this and started wondering 'what was going on, what is happening here?' One question led to another. Why are they sending kids far away from their families overseas? Why are they attacking their own kids in the street?" Returning to Detroit, Motown songwriter Al Cleveland wrote and composed a song based on his conversations with Benson of what he had seen in Berkeley. Benson sent the song to the Four Tops but his bandmates turned the song down. Benson said, "My partners told me it was a protest song. I said 'no man, it's a love song, about love and understanding. I'm not protesting. I want to know what's going on.

Benson offered the song to Marvin Gaye when he participated in a golf game with the singer. Returning to Gaye's home outside Outer Drive, Benson played the song to Gaye on his guitar. Gaye felt the song's moody flow would be perfect for The Originals. Benson eventually convinced Gaye that it was his song. The singer responded by asking for partial writing credit, which Benson allowed. Gaye added new musical composition, a new melody and lyrics that reflected Gaye's own disgust. Benson said later that Gaye tweaked and enriched the song, "added some things that were more ghetto, more natural, which made it seem like a story and not a song ... we measured him for the suit and he tailored the hell out of it." During this time, Gaye had been deeply affected by letters shared between him and his brother after he had returned from service in the Vietnam War over the treatment of Vietnam veterans.

Gaye had also been deeply affected by the social ills plaguing the United States at the time, and covered the track "Abraham, Martin & John", in 1969, which became a UK hit for him in 1970. Gaye cited the 1965 Watts riots as a pivotal moment in his life in which he asked himself, "with the world exploding around me, how am I supposed to keep singing love songs?" One night, he called Berry Gordy about doing a protest record, to which Gordy chastised him, "Marvin, don't be ridiculous. That's taking things too far." The singer's brother Frankie wrote in his 2003 autobiography, My Brother Marvin, that while reuniting at their former childhood home in Washington, D.C., Frankie's recalling of his tenure at the war made both brothers cry. At one point, Marvin sat propped up in a bed with his hands in his face. Afterwards, Gaye told his brother: "I didn't know how to fight before, but now I think I do. I just have to do it my way. I'm not a painter. I'm not a poet. But I can do it with music."

In an interview with Rolling Stone, Marvin Gaye discussed what had shaped his view on more socially conscious themes in music and the conception of his eleventh studio album:

Recording

On June 1, 1970, Gaye entered Motown's Hitsville U.S.A. studios to record "What's Going On". Immediately after learning about the song, many of Motown's musicians, known as The Funk Brothers noted that there was a different approach with Gaye's record from that used on other Motown recordings, and Gaye complicated matters by bringing in only a few of the members while bringing his own recruits, including drummer Chet Forest. Longtime Funk Brothers members Jack Ashford, James Jamerson and Eddie Brown participated in the recording. Jamerson was pulled into the recording studio by Gaye after he located Jamerson playing with a local band at a blues bar and Eli Fontaine, the saxophonist behind "Baby, I'm For Real", also participated in the recording. Jamerson, who couldn't sit properly on his seat after arriving to the session drunk, performed his bass riffs, written for him by the album's arranger David Van De Pitte, on the floor. Fontaine's alto saxophone riff to open the song was not originally intended. When Gaye heard the playback of what Fontaine thought was simply a demo, Gaye instantly decided that the riff was the ideal way to start the song. When Fontaine said he was "just goofing around", Gaye being pleased with the results replied, "Well, you goof off exquisitely. Thank you."

The laid-back sessions of the single were credited to lots of "marijuana smoke and rounds of Scotch". Gaye's trademark multi-layering vocal approach came off initially as an accident by engineers Steve Smith and Kenneth Sands. Sands later explained that Gaye had wanted him to bring him the two lead vocal takes for "What's Going On" for advice on which one he should use for the final song. Smith and Sands accidentally mixed the two lead vocal takes together. Gaye loved the sound and decided to keep it and use it for the duration of the album.

That September, Gaye approached Gordy with the "What's Going On" song while in California where Gordy had relocated. According to one account, Gordy didn't like the song, allegedly calling it "the worst thing I ever heard in my life". As a result, Gaye angrily responded to Gordy's alleged putdown by going on strike until Gordy changed his mind. Gordy himself denied this claim, stating he loved the song's jazzy feel but cautioned Gaye that the sound was out of date of the sound of the times and also feared the loss of Gaye's crossover audience by releasing the political song. Gaye continued to record his own compositions during this time, some of which later made his 1973 album, Let's Get It On. Motown executive Harry Balk recalled trying to get Gordy to release the song at the end of the year, to which Gordy replied to him, "that Dizzy Gillespie stuff in the middle, that scatting, it's old." Gordy mentioned later that he feared no one would buy songs with a jazz influence after his attempt to be a record store owner of a jazz shop folded after a year, years prior to starting Motown. Most of Motown's Quality Control Department team also turned the song down, with Balk later stating that "they were used to the 'baby baby' stuff, and this was a little hard for them to grasp."

With the help of Motown sales executive Barney Ales, Harry Balk got the song released to record stores on January 20, 1971, sending 100,000 copies of the song without Gordy's knowledge, with another 100,000 copies sent after that success. Upon its release, the song became a hit and was Motown's fastest-selling single at the time, peaking at number 1 on the Hot Soul Singles Chart, and peaking at number 2 on the Billboard Hot 100. Stunned by the news, Gordy drove to Gaye's home to discuss making a complete album, stating Gaye could do what he wanted with his music if he finished the record within 30 days before the end of March and thus effectively giving him the right to produce his own albums. Gaye returned to Hitsville to record the rest of What's Going On, which took a mere ten business days between March 1 and March 10. The album's rhythm tracks and sound overdubs were recorded at Hitsville, or Studio A, while the strings, horns, lead and background vocals were recorded at Golden World, or Studio B.

The album's original mix, recorded in Detroit at both Hitsville and Golden World as well as United Sound Studios, was finalized on April 5, 1971. When Gordy listened to the mix, he worried that no other hit single would emerge from it. To ease Gordy's worries, Gaye and the album's engineers entered The Sound Factory in West Hollywood in early May, integrating the orchestra somewhat closer with the rhythm tracks, while Gaye used different vocal tracks and added extra instrumentation. Presented to Motown's Quality Control department team, they were worried about future hit singles due to its concurrent style with each song leading to the next. Gordy however vetoed their decision, agreeing to put this mix of the album out that month.

Music and lyrics

"What's Going On," the title track, features soulful, passionate vocals and multi-tracked background singing, both by Gaye. The song had strong jazz, gospel, classical music orchestration, and arrangements. Reviewer Eric Henderson of Slant stated the song had an "understandably mournful tone" in response to the fallout of the late 1960s counterculture movements. Henderson also wrote that "Gaye's choice to emphasize humanity at its most charitable rather than paint bleak pictures of destruction and disillusionment is characteristic of the album that follows."

This is immediately followed in segue flow by the second track, "What's Happening Brother", a song Gaye dedicated to his brother Frankie, in which Gaye wrote to explain the disillusionment of war veterans who returned to civilian life and their disconnect from pop culture. "Flyin' High (In the Friendly Sky)", which took its title from a United Airlines tag, "fly the friendly skies", dealt with dependence on heroin. The lyric, "I know, I'm hooked my friend, to the boy, who makes slaves out of men", references heroin as "boy", which was slang for the drug. "Save the Children" was an emotional plea to help disadvantaged children, warning, "who really cares/who's willing to try/to save a world/that is destined to die?", later crying out, "save the babies". A truncated version of "God Is Love" follows "Save the Children" and makes references to God.

"Mercy Mercy Me (The Ecology)" was another emotional plea, this time for the environment. According to Motown legend, musician and Funk Brothers leader Earl Van Dyke once mentioned that Berry Gordy didn't know of the word "ecology" and had to be told what it was though Gordy himself claimed otherwise. The song featured a memorable tenor saxophone solo from Detroit music legend Wild Bill Moore. "Right On" was a lengthy seven-minute jam influenced by funk rock and Latin soul rhythms that focused on Gaye's own divided soul in which Gaye later pleaded in falsetto, "if you let me, I will take you to live where love is King" after complying that "true love can conquer hate every time". "Wholy Holy" follows "God Is Love" as an emotional gospel plea advising people to "come together" to "proclaim love [as our] salvation". The final track, "Inner City Blues (Make Me Wanna Holler)", focuses on urban poverty, backed by a minimalist, dark blues-oriented funk vibe, with its bass riffs composed and performed by Bob Babbitt, who also performed on "Mercy Mercy Me" (Jamerson played on the rest of the album). The entire album's stylistic use of a song cycle gave it a cohesive feel and was one of R&B's first concept albums, described as "a groundbreaking experiment in collating a pseudo-classical suite of free-flowing songs."

David Hepworth described the album as "like a jazz record not merely because it had jazz manners and was slathered in strings and employed congas and triangle as its most prominent form of percussion...But it's also jazz in the sense that...[i]t plays like one long single."

The Absolute Sound described the album as "a brilliant psychedelic soul song-cycle".

Release and promotion 
Released on May 21, 1971, What's Going On became Gaye's Top 10 entry on the Billboard Top LPs, peaking at number six.  It stayed on the chart over a year, selling some two million copies within twelve months.  It was Motown's (and Gaye's) best-selling album to that date – until he released Let's Get It On in 1973. It also became Gaye's second number-one album on Billboards Soul LPs chart, where it stayed for nine weeks, remaining on the Billboard Soul LPs chart for 58 weeks throughout 1971 and 1972. The title track, which had been released in January 1971 as the lead single to promote the album, sold more than 200,000 copies within its first week and two-and-a-half-million by the end of the year. It hit number 1 in Record World, number 2 on the Billboard Hot 100 (behind Three Dog Night's "Joy to the World"), number 1 on the Cash Box Top 100, and held the pole position on Billboard's Soul Singles chart five weeks running.

The follow-up single, "Mercy Mercy Me (The Ecology)", peaked at number-four on the Hot 100, and also went number-one on the R&B chart. The third, and final, single, "Inner City Blues (Make Me Wanna Holler)", peaked at number-nine on the Hot 100, while also rising to number-one on the R&B chart, thus making Gaye the first male solo artist to place three top ten singles on the Hot 100 off one album, as well as the first artist to place three singles at number one on any Billboard chart (in this case, R&B), off one single album. The album had a modest commercial reception in countries such as Canada and the United Kingdom; "Save the Children" reached number 41 on the latter country's singles chart, while the album, 25 years after its original release, reached number 56 . In 1984, the album re-entered the Billboard 200 following Gaye's untimely death. In 1994, the album was certified gold by the Recording Industry Association of America in the United States for sales of half a million copies after it was issued on CD. According to Nielsen SoundScan, it has vended over 1.6 million copies since sales tracking began (in 1991).  It was certified platinum by the British Phonographic Industry for shipments of 300,000 albums.

Six months after the release of What's Going On, Sly and the Family Stone released There's a Riot Goin' On (1971), titled in response to Gaye's album.

Critical reception

What's Going On was generally well received by contemporary critics. Writing for Rolling Stone in 1971, Vince Aletti praised Gaye's thematic approach towards social and political concerns, while discussing the surprise of Motown releasing such an album. In a joint review of What's Going On and Stevie Wonder's Where I'm Coming From, Aletti wrote, "Ambitious, personal albums may be a glut on the market elsewhere, but at Motown they're something new ... the album as a whole takes precedence, absorbing its own flaws. There are very few performers who could carry a project like this off. I've always admired Marvin Gaye, but I didn't expect that he would be one of them. Guess I seriously underestimated him. It won't happen again." Billboard described the record as "a cross between Curtis Mayfield and that old Motown spell and outdoes anything Gaye's ever done". Time magazine hailed it as a "vast, melodically deft symphonic pop suite". The Village Voice critic Robert Christgau was less impressed. Writing in Christgau's Record Guide: Rock Albums of the Seventies (1981), he deemed it both a "groundbreaking personal statement" and a Berry Gordy product, baited by three highly original singles but marred elsewhere by indistinct music and indulgent use of David Van De Pitte's strings, which Christgau called "the lowest kind of movie-background dreck".

According to Paul Gambaccini, Gaye's death in 1984 prompted a critical re-evaluation of the album, and most reviewers have since regarded it as an important masterpiece of popular music. In MusicHound R&B (1998), Gary Graff said What's Going On was "not just a great Gaye album but is one of the great pop albums of all time", and Rolling Stone later credited the album for having "revolutionized black music". The Washington Post critic Geoffrey Himes names it an exemplary release of the progressive soul development from 1968 to 1973, and Pitchforks Tom Breihan calls it a prog-soul masterpiece. BBC Music's David Katz described the album as "one of the greatest albums of all time, and nothing short of a masterpiece" and compared it to Miles Davis's Kind of Blue by saying "its non-standard musical arrangements, which heralded a new sound at the time, gives it a chilling edge that ultimately underscores its gravity, with subtle orchestral enhancements offset by percolating congas, expertly layered above James Jamerson's bubbling bass". In his 1994 review of Gaye's re-issues, Chicago Tribune reviewer Greg Kot described the album as "soul music's first 'art' album, an inner-city response to the Celtic mysticism of Van Morrison's Astral Weeks, the psychedelic pop of The Beatles' Sgt. Pepper's Lonely Hearts Club Band [and] the rewired blues of Bob Dylan's Highway 61 Revisited." Richie Unterberger found the album somewhat overrated, writing in The Rough Guide to Rock (2003) that much of its "meandering introspection" paled in comparison to its three singles.

A remastered deluxe edition with 28 additional tracks was released on May 31, 2011, to similar acclaim. At Metacritic, which assigns a normalized rating out of 100 to reviews from mainstream critics, the album received an average score of 100, based on ten reviews.

Accolades
In 1985, writers on British music weekly the NME voted it best album of all time. In 2004, the album's title track was ranked number four on Rolling Stones list of the 500 Greatest Songs of All Time. A 1999 critics' poll conducted by British newspaper The Guardian named it the "Greatest Album of the 20th Century". In 1997, What's Going On was named the 17th greatest album of all time in a poll conducted in the United Kingdom by HMV Group, Channel 4, The Guardian and Classic FM. In 1997, The Guardian ranked the album number one on its list of the 100 Best Albums Ever. In 1998 Q magazine readers placed it at number 97, while in 2001 the TV network VH1 placed it at number 4. In 2003, it was one of 50 recordings chosen that year by the Library of Congress to be added to the National Recording Registry. What's Going On was ranked number 6 on Rolling Stone magazine's 2003 list of the 500 Greatest Albums of All Time, one of three Gaye albums to be included, succeeded by 1973's Let's Get It On (number 165) and 1978's Here, My Dear (number 462). The album is Gaye's highest-ranking entry on the list, as well as several other publications' lists. In a revised 2020 list, this time voted on by musicians instead of music critics, the album moved up to the top spot, replacing The Beatles' Sgt. Pepper's Lonely Hearts Club Band.

Track listing

Original release
All songs produced by Marvin Gaye. Songwriters as shown in the 1971 original album liner notes release:

2001 Deluxe Edition
In 2001, a "Deluxe Edition" 2-CD version of the album was released by Motown, which included the original LP as released, the discarded "Detroit Mix" of the album, and the mono 45 rpm mixes of the singles. Also included was a recording of Gaye's first live concert performance after two years away from the stage following Tammi Terrell's illness and death, performed at The Kennedy Center Concert Hall in his native Washington, D.C., on May 1, 1972.

2011 Super Deluxe Edition
Disc 1 (original album & bonus tracks)
"What's Going On" (Original Rejected Single Mix)
 "Head Title (Distant Lover)" (Demo)
 "Symphony" (Demo)
 "I Love the Ground You Walk On" (Instrumental)
 "What's Going On" (Mono Single Version)
 "God is Love" (Mono Single Version)
 "Mercy Mercy Me (The Ecology)" (Mono Single Version)
 "Sad Tomorrows" (Mono Single Version)
 "Inner City Blues (Make Me Wanna Holler)" (Mono Single Version)
 "Wholy Holy" (Mono Single Version)

Disc 2 ("The Detroit Instrumental Sessions and More")
 "Checking Out (Double Clutch)"
 "Chained"
 "Country Stud"
 "Help the People"
 "Running from Love" (Version 1)
 "Daybreak"
 "Doing My Thing"
 "T Stands for Time"
 "Jesus is Our Love Song"
 "Funky Nation"
 "Infinity"
 "Mandota" (Instrumental)
 "Struttin' the Blues"
 "Running from Love" (Version 2 with Strings)
 "I'm Going Home (Move)"
 "You're the Man" (Parts I & II)
 "You're the Man" (Alternate Version 1)
 "You're the Man" (Alternate Version 2)

LP (Original Detroit Mix – April 5, 1971)
 "What's Going On" (Detroit Mix) – 4:08
 "What's Happening Brother" (Detroit Mix) – 2:43
 "Flyin' High (In the Friendly Sky)" (Detroit Mix) – 3:49
 "Save the Children" (Detroit Mix) – 4:02
 "God Is Love" (Detroit Mix) – 1:47
 "Mercy Mercy Me (The Ecology)" (Detroit Mix) – 3:08
 "Right On" (Detroit Mix) – 7:32
 "Wholy Holy" (Detroit Mix) – 3:08
 "Inner City Blues (Make Me Wanna Holler)" (Detroit Mix) – 5:46

Personnel

 All lead vocals by Marvin Gaye
 Produced by Marvin Gaye
 Members of the Detroit Symphony Orchestra Conducted and Arranged by David Van De Pitte
 Background vocals:
 Marvin Gaye
 The Andantes (Jackie Hicks, Marlene Barrow, and Louvain Demps)
 Mel Farr, Charlie Sanders and Lem Barney of the Detroit Lions 
 Dave Bing of the Detroit Pistons
 Bobby Rogers of The Miracles
 Elgie Stover
 Kenneth Stover
 Strings, Woodwinds and Brass
 Gordon Staples, Zinovi Bistritzky, Beatriz Budinzky, Richard Margitza, Virginia Halfmann, Felix Resnick, Alvin Score, Lillian Downs, James Waring – violins
 Edouard Kesner, Meyer Shapiro, David Ireland, Nathan Gordon – violas
 Italo Babini, Thaddeus Markiewicz, Edward Korkigan – cellos
 Max Janowsky – double bass
 Carole Crosby – harp
 Dayna Hardwick, William Perich – flutes
 Larry Nozero, Angelo Carlisi, George Benson, Tate Houston – saxophones
 John Trudell, Maurice Davis – trumpets
 Nilesh Pawar – oboe
 Carl Raetz – trombone

 The Funk Brothers –  Instrumentation, spoken interlude ("What's Going On") and solo horns
 Eli Fountain – alto saxophone "What's Going On"
 Wild Bill Moore – tenor saxophone "Mercy Mercy Me"
 Marvin Gaye – piano, Mellotron ("Mercy Mercy Me"), box drum ("What's Going On")
 Johnny Griffith – celeste, additional keyboards
 Earl Van Dyke – additional keyboards
 Jack Brokensha – vibraphone, percussion
 Joe Messina, Robert White – electric guitars
 James Jamerson – bass guitar "What's Going On", "What's Happening Brother", "Flyin' High", "Save the Children", "God Is Love", and the b-side "Sad Tomorrows"
 Bob Babbitt – bass guitar "Mercy Mercy Me", "Right On", "Wholy Holy" and "Inner City Blues"
 Chet Forest – drums
 Jack Ashford – tambourine, percussion
 Eddie "Bongo" Brown – bongos, congas
 Earl DeRouen – bongos and congas "Right On"
 Bobbye Hall – bongos "Inner City Blues"
 Katherine Marking – graphic design
 Alana Coghlan – graphic design
 John Matousek – mastering
 Vic Anesini – Digital Remastering
 James Hendin – Photography
 Curtis McNair – Art Direction

Charts

Weekly charts

Year-end charts

Certifications

See also

 List of number-one R&B albums of 1971 (U.S.)
 What's Going On Live, a 2019 album

References

Sources

External links
 
 
 "Marvin Gaye: What's Going On Now"—an episode of the BBC World Service radio program The Documentary on the making of the album, on the 50th anniversary of its release

1971 albums
Albums produced by Marvin Gaye
Albums recorded at Hitsville U.S.A.
Concept albums
Grammy Hall of Fame Award recipients
Marvin Gaye albums
Orchestral pop albums
Pop albums by American artists
Psychedelic music albums by American artists
Psychedelic soul albums
Tamla Records albums
United States National Recording Registry albums